Joseph "Joe" Milikan (born April 30, 1950 in Randleman, North Carolina) is a former NASCAR Winston Cup race car driver who competed from the 1979 NASCAR Winston Cup Series season to the 1986 NASCAR Winston Cup Series season.

Career
The majority of Millikan's races were done in Chevrolet vehicles (either Chevrolet Monte Carlo, Chevrolet Laguna, or Chevrolet Impala). However, other races in Joe Milikan's career were done in Pontiac (Pontiac Grand Prix) and Oldsmobile (Oldsmobile Cutlass) vehicles but rarely in Ford (Ford Thunderbird) vehicles. His highest amount of winnings earned was at the 1979 NASCAR Winston Cup Series with $199,460 ($ adjusted for inflation).

References

External links
 
 ESPN Sports
 Driver Averages - NASCAR Statistics
 Insider Racing News

1950 births
Living people
NASCAR drivers
People from Randleman, North Carolina
Racing drivers from North Carolina